Slaves Mass is a 1977 album by Brazilian composer and multi-instrumentalist Hermeto Pascoal.  Recorded for Warner Bros. Records, the album featured some of the most beloved Brazilian musicians of the time.

Track listing

The bonus tracks were included in 2004, when the album was released on CD.

Personnel
Hermeto Pascoal: piano, keyboards, clavinet, melodica, soprano sax, flutes, acoustic guitar, twelve strings guitar and vocals (in "Cannon").
Flora Purim: vocals (in "Slaves mass" and "Cannon").
Airto Moreira: drums (all tracks except "Mixing pot", "Pica pau" and "Star trap"), percussion and vocals (in "Cannon").
Chester Thompson: drums (in "Mixing pot", "Pica pau" and "Star trap").
Ron Carter: acoustic bass (all tracks except "Mixing pot", "Pica pau" and "Star trap").
Alphonso Johnson: electric bass (in "Mixing pot", "Pica pau" and "Star trap").
Raul de Souza: trombone and vocals (in "Cannon")
David Amaro: electric guitar, acoustic guitar and twelve strings guitar.
Hugo Fattoruso: vocals (in "Cannon").
Laudir de Oliveira: vocals (in "Cannon").

References

Hermeto Pascoal albums
1976 albums
Warner Records albums